Escape is a 2005 Russian crime thriller film directed by Egor Konchalovsky.

Plot 
The film tells about the successful man Yevgeny Vetrov, whose wife suddenly died. All the evidence was against Vetrov. He was convicted and he decides to escape.

Cast 
 Yevgeny Mironov as Yevgeny Vetrov
 Aleksey Serebryakov as Pakhomov
 Andrey Smolyakov as Topilin
 Sergey Astakhov as Sobolev
 Viktoriya Tolstoganova as Irina
 Lyubov Tolkalina as Tatyana
 Natalya Arinbasarova as Orphanage Director (as N. Arinbasarova)
 Yury Belyayev
 Sergey Gabrielyan
 Kseniya Lavrova-Glinka

References

External links 
 

2005 films
2000s Russian-language films
Russian crime thriller films
Russian detective films
2000s crime thriller films